Logan Field may refer to:

Airports:
 Logan Field (Alabama), an airport serving Samson, Alabama, United States
 Logan Field (Maryland), a former airport in Baltimore, Maryland, United States
 Logan International Airport, serving Boston, Massachusetts, United States

People:
 Logan Field (actor), a late actor in A Hobo's Christmas